Norman Hunter (29 October 1943 – 17 April 2020) was an English footballer who played for Leeds United, Bristol City, Barnsley and England. He was part of the 1966 FIFA World Cup winning squad, receiving a winner's medal in 2007. He was the first winner of the PFA Players' Player of the Year award in 1974, and was included in the Football League 100 Legends. A tough tackling centre-half and defensive midfielder, he was nicknamed "Bites Yer Legs" Hunter. The nickname originated from a banner held up by Leeds United fans at the 1972 FA Cup Final against Arsenal; the banner read "Norman bites yer legs". He played 726 games in total for Leeds, scoring 21 goals.

Playing career

Leeds United
Hunter was born in Eighton Banks, Gateshead, in 1943 and joined Leeds at the age of 15, giving up a career as an electrical fitter to do so. He made his first-team debut against Swansea Town in September 1962, forming a partnership at the back with Jack Charlton which lasted for a decade. Leeds were promoted to the First Division in 1964, and Hunter picked up winner's medals as Leeds won the League Cup, the Fairs Cup in 1968 and 1971, and the League Championship in 1969. He was a consistent performer, playing 50 or more games for nine seasons in a row and playing all 42 league games in five separate seasons.

In 1972, Leeds won the FA Cup via a goal from Allan Clarke. A famous photograph of Hunter's celebration when the goal went in has been published many times. At the end of the game, Hunter climbed the steps to the Royal box twice; once to collect his own medal, and then again to help Mick Jones negotiate his way up and down, as Jones had been receiving treatment for a dislocated elbow while his teammates had been getting their prizes.

1973 saw defeats in two finals, as Leeds lost in the FA Cup Final to Sunderland, and then a few days later, to A.C. Milan in the European Cup Winners' Cup, a game overshadowed by rumours of match-fixing. Hunter was sent off in the latter match for retaliation.

In the 1973–74 season, Leeds started the season with a 29-match unbeaten run, which led them to the title, giving Hunter his second League winners medal. At the end of that season, Hunter was the first winner of the PFA Players' Player of the Year award. As title holders Leeds thus entered the European Cup the following season, and Hunter was a member of the team that reached the 1975 European Cup Final, only to lose 2–0 to Bayern Munich.

Bristol City
After 540 Football League appearances and 726 in total for Leeds, Hunter signed for Bristol City on 28 October 1976 for £40,000, and remained there for three years, making 108 league appearances (122 in total) and scoring four goals.

Barnsley
Hunter finished his playing career with three seasons from 1979 to 1982 at Barnsley, where he was also manager from 1980 to 1984.

Managerial and coaching career
Hunter was appointed Barnsley manager on 16 September 1980 after ex-Leeds player Allan Clarke left to take over as manager at Leeds United. That season, Hunter took Barnsley to second place in the Third Division and won promotion to Division Two. Hunter had two good seasons, 1980-81 and 1981-82, but then a mediocre one in 1982-83. After that Barnsley started to struggle and Hunter was sacked on 8 February 1984 after a 3-2 home defeat by Cardiff City. He had a further managerial spell at Rotherham United (24 June 1985 to 9 December 1987) and was assistant manager to Terry Yorath at Bradford City, 1989 to February 1990. Hunter also worked as a coach for manager Johnny Giles at West Bromwich Albion

International career
Hunter played three games for England under-23 before given his debut for the England team in 1965 by manager Alf Ramsey. On 8 December 1965, England played Spain in Madrid. Hunter came on in his first game, as a 35th minute substitute for Joe Baker. The substitution of Hunter in a midfield position allowed Ramsey to deploy both Bobby Charlton and Alan Ball in more attacking roles as England won 2–0. The existing partnership between Jack Charlton and Bobby Moore meant that he spent much of his international career as an understudy, winning 28 caps in total. He was in the squad which won the 1966 World Cup but did not play any games.

Hunter scored the winning goal against Spain in England's quarter-final qualifying round for the 1968 European Championship, he then started in both the 1–0 semi final defeat to Yugoslavia and the 2–0 victory over the Soviet Union in the bronze medal match. He spent a short part of the 1970 season injured but he was in Alf Ramsey's squad for the summer's World Cup in Mexico, however his only appearance in the tournament was coming on as a late substitute in the 3–2 defeat by West Germany.

In 1973, Hunter was in the England team which needed to win their last qualifying tie for the 1974 World Cup in West Germany. The opposition at Wembley were Poland, who just needed a draw to qualify at England's expense. It was 0–0 when Hunter went to make a tackle, but instead trod on the ball and lost it. Poland quickly made a counterattack allowing Grzegorz Lato to run clear and set up Jan Domarski to score. Allan Clarke equalised with a penalty but England could not score again, and the 1–1 draw saw them miss out on a place at the World Cup.

Post-playing and managerial career
Hunter turned to the after-dinner circuit recounting his anecdotes, and from 1993 to 2020 he worked for local station BBC Radio Leeds and Yorkshire Radio as a summariser at Leeds games.

In 1998, the Football League, as part of its centenary season celebrations, included Hunter on its list of 100 League Legends.

Hunter released his autobiography, Biting Talk, in 2004.

In the 1966 World Cup final only the 11 players on the pitch at the end of the 4–2 win over West Germany received medals. Following a Football Association-led campaign to persuade FIFA to award medals to all the squad members, Hunter was presented with his winner's medal by Gordon Brown at a ceremony at 10 Downing Street on 10 June 2009.

Hunter retained close links with Leeds United and its fans, and regularly appeared at Leeds matches and figured at club-hosted conferences and events; the eponymous "Norman Hunter Suite" is located in the West Stand at Elland Road.

Following Hunter's death on 17 April 2020, Leeds United announced on 23 April that the South Stand at Elland Road would be renamed after Hunter.

Personal life
In 1968 Hunter married Susan Harper, and the couple had two children, Michael and Claire.

On 10 April 2020, it was reported that Hunter was being treated in hospital after testing positive for COVID-19. On 16 April he was described as being "severely unwell". The following day, Leeds United announced that Hunter died from the virus, aged 76, stating that "[his death] leaves a huge hole in the Leeds United family [and] his legacy will never be forgotten".

Career statistics

Honours
Leeds United
 Football League First Division: 1968–69, 1973–74
 Football League Second Division: 1963–64
 FA Cup: 1971–72; runners-up: 1964–65, 1969–70, 1972–73
 Football League Cup: 1967–68
 FA Charity Shield: 1969; runners-up: 1974
 Inter-Cities Fairs Cup: 1967–68, 1970–71; runners-up: 1966–67
 European Cup runners-up: 1974–75
 European Cup Winners' Cup runners-up: 1972–73

England
 World Cup: 1966
 European Championship third place: 1968

Individual
 PFA Players' Player of the Year: 1973–74
 PFA Team of the Year: 1973–74
 Football League 100 Legends: 1998
 Leeds United Player of the Year: 1971

References

External links
 
 

1943 births
2020 deaths
Footballers from Gateshead
English footballers
English football managers
Barnsley F.C. managers
Barnsley F.C. players
Bristol City F.C. players
Leeds United F.C. players
Rotherham United F.C. managers
England international footballers
England under-23 international footballers
Bradford City A.F.C. non-playing staff
1966 FIFA World Cup players
UEFA Euro 1968 players
1970 FIFA World Cup players
FIFA World Cup-winning players
English Football League players
Association football defenders
English Football League representative players
English Football Hall of Fame inductees
Association football player-managers
English autobiographers
English Football League managers
Association football coaches
West Bromwich Albion F.C. non-playing staff
Deaths from the COVID-19 pandemic in England
FA Cup Final players